The name Noul has been used to name three tropical cyclones in the northwestern Pacific Ocean. The name was contributed by North Korea and it means glowing or sunset. This name replaced Pongsona, meaning "garden balsam" after the 2002 Pacific typhoon season.

 Tropical Storm Noul (2008) (T0821, 26W, Tonyo) - Affected Vietnam

 Typhoon Noul (2015) (T1506, 06W, Dodong) - A Category 5 typhoon that caused minimal damage in the Philippines.
 Tropical Storm Noul (2020) (T2011, 13W, Leon) - A tropical storm that caused minor damage in Vietnam.

Pacific typhoon set index articles